The 1985 Washington State Cougars football team was an American football team that represented Washington State University in the Pacific-10 Conference (Pac-10) during the 1985 NCAA Division I-A football season. In their eighth season under head coach Jim Walden, the Cougars compiled a 4–7 record (3–5 in Pac-10, tied for seventh), and outscored their opponents 313 to 282. Home games were played on campus at Martin Stadium in Pullman, Washington.

The team's statistical leaders included Mark Rypien with 2,174 passing yards, Rueben Mayes with 1,236 rushing yards, and Kitrick Taylor with 489 receiving yards.

This season's offense included the "RPM" backfield: Rypien at quarterback, with Kerry Porter and Mayes at running back. All three were previous first team all-conference selections (Porter as a sophomore in 1983), and expectations were high; injuries on defense took a toll and five of their losses were by a touchdown or less.

In the Apple Cup, the Cougars won again in Husky Stadium for their third win over Washington in the last four years. With frigid temperatures and snow on the Palouse prior to the game, the Cougars held indoor practices in the evening at the Kibbie Dome in neighboring Moscow, Idaho.

Mayes rushed for over 150 yards in each of the last four games and repeated as the Pac-10 offensive player of the year. Defensive lineman Erik Howard and return specialist Kitrick Taylor were also named All-Pac-10.

Schedule

Personnel

Season summary

at Washington

NFL Draft
Four Cougars were selected in the 1986 NFL Draft.

References

Washington State
Washington State Cougars football seasons
Washington State Cougars football